Radôstka is a village and municipality in Čadca District in the Žilina Region of northern Slovakia.

History
In historical records the village was first mentioned in 1662.

Geography
The municipality lies at an altitude of 487 metres and covers an area of 13.172 km². It has a population of about 886 people.

External links
http://www.statistics.sk/mosmis/eng/run.html

Villages and municipalities in Čadca District